Baiya is a town in the county-level city of Langzhong, Nanchong, Sichuan, China. As of 2020, Baiya has a population of 22,158 people.

History 
On August 2, 2005, the now-defunct townships of Gaoguan, Jinyu, and Yunong were merged into Baiya.

Administrative divisions 
Baiya administers four residential communities and eight administrative villages.

Residential communities 
Baiya contains the following four residential communities:

 Baiya Community
 Jinyu Community
 Yunong Community
 Gaoguan Community

Administrative villages 
Baiya contains the following eight administrative villages:

 Fulemiao Village
 Shangyou Village
 Huxi Village
 Chunfeng Village
 Laofangzui Village
 Lujiaoxi Village
 Nandengguan Village
 Junqingsi Village

Demographics 
According to the 2020 Chinese Census, Baiya has a population of 22,158 people. 3.56% of Langzhong's total population lives in Baiya. The town's males comprised 51.18% percent of the population, while females comprised 48.82% of the population. 13.09% of the town's population is 14 years of age or younger, 49.76% is between the ages of 15 and 59, and 37.15% is 60 years of age or older. 29.72% of Baiya's population is 65 years of age or older.

Historical populations 
As of the 2010 Chinese Census, Baiya had a population of 31,235, up from the 19,920 recorded in the 2000 Chinese Census. This increase is likely due to the expansion of the town of Baiya, which incorporated a number of now-defunct townships in 2005.

See also 
 List of township-level divisions of Sichuan

References 

Towns in Sichuan
Nanchong